Roger Lafontant (1931–September 29, 1991) was the former leader of the Tonton Macoutes and the former Minister of Haitian dictator Jean-Claude Duvalier. He was the leader of an attempted coup d'état in January 1991, an effort which ultimately led to his death.

Early life
As a student studying to become a gynecologist, he founded the student branch of the Tontons Macoutes, which supported dictatorship under President François Duvalier and his son Jean-Claude Duvalier.

Duvalier era
In November 1972, he became Minister of the Interior and National Defense Jean-Claude Duvalier was then rejected because of his personal ambitions. Lafontant was then sent as consul in Montreal, Canada. He returned in August 1983, and was appointed Minister of State for the Interior and National Defense.

In 1986, with the fall of Jean-Claude Duvalier, he went again into exile to the Dominican Republic.

Return to Haiti after exile
He reappeared July 7, 1990, to enter the race for the presidency at the head of the Union for National Reconciliation. Radio Liberté, founded by Serge Beaulieu a nostalgic for the Duvalier era, supported the candidacy of Lafontant on AM and FM bands. His candidacy is finally rejected by the Provisional Electoral Council (CEP). On July 18, 1990, an arrest warrant was issued against him following a court proceeding against him.

Attempted coup d'état
During the conduct of democratic elections in Haiti from 1990 to 1991, Roger Lafontant attempted a coup on the night of January 6–7, 1991. While Roger Lafontant claimed to have the support of the army, General Hérard Abraham and the military high command immediately condemned the coup. In a statement to the public, General Abraham spoke on Monday morning, on the mutiny of a group "in the pay of Roger Lafontant" who hijacked the provisional President of the Republic, Ertha Pascal-Trouillot "after forced to resign." Gen. Abraham said that while "the armed forces of Haiti, faithful to their constitutional responsibilities", condemned the "terrorist act" and "take all steps to ensure that the situation returns to normal." He called "the population to remain calm."

The international community and the Organization of American States condemned the attempt to overthrow the provisional government of Haiti. The day of the coup, the OAS Permanent Council held an emergency meeting to discuss the situation in Haiti and decided to support the interim government. Some 75 people were killed and over 150 others were injured in the violence that erupted in Port-au-Prince during the attempted coup. Roger Lafontant was arrested with a dozen accomplices, soldiers, and militia members of the Tontons Macoutes.

Aftermath and death
On July 31, 1991, Lafontant was sentenced to life in prison for his attempted coup against the government of Haiti. He was killed in prison during a coup later that year on September 30, 1991.

References

1931 births
1991 deaths
Haitian anti-communists
Haitian exiles
Haitian expatriates in the Dominican Republic
Haitian military leaders